The 2018 Rugby Americas North Championship, the 11th edition of the tournament, is a rugby union championship for Tier 3 North American and Caribbean teams.

Format

A significant restructuring of the tournament took place for the 2018 edition in order to accommodate the launch of the Americas Rugby Challenge. Unlike previous editions of the tournament, the teams will not be split geographically into north and south conferences, but will instead be combined into three tiered divisions: the Championship, the Cup, and the Trophy. Mexico and Guyana do not return to the RAN Championship as they are competing in the 2018 Americas Rugby Challenge. The lower placed of those two teams will enter a promotion/relegation playoff with the top team in the RAN Championship (excluding USA South) for a place in the 2019 Americas Rugby Challenge.

Championship

  (76)
  USA South (N/A)
  (53)
  (52)

Cup

  (67)
  (79)

Trophy

  (N/A)
  (N/A)
  (N/A)

pre-tournament World Rugby Rankings in parentheses.

Championship

While Trinidad and Tobago played two of their games, they were removed from tournament standings due to being unable to rearrange their fixture against Cayman Islands, scheduled for June 23, due to a lack of funding.

Standings

Matches

Cup

Standings

Matches

Trophy

Standings

Matches

Promotion playoffs

References

Rugby Americas North
Rugby Americas North
Rugby Americas North
Rugby Americas North
Rugby Americas North
Rugby Americas North
Rugby Americas North
Rugby Americas Northt
Rugby Americas North
Rugby Americas North
Rugby Americas North